All 6's and 7's is the eleventh studio album by American rapper Tech N9ne. It was released on June 7, 2011, through Strange Music. The album was released to universal acclaim by music critics, and peaked at number four on the Billboard 200 and at number one on the Top R&B/Hip-Hop Albums charts.

Background
Tech stated that the album title All 6's and 7's means "in a state of confusion and disarray." He also said that this will be his "biggest" and "craziest" album of all. The album would feature guest appearances from B.o.B, Hopsin, Yelawolf, Snoop Dogg, Jay Rock, Twista, T-Pain, Lil Wayne, E-40, Busta Rhymes and Kendrick Lamar, among others. Tech had expressed an interest in collaborating with Nicki Minaj, Janelle Monáe and Tyler, the Creator. Eminem was initially set to appear on the track "So Lonely", but was unable to record his verse in time before the album's official release.

Promotion
The first official single, "He's a Mental Giant" was released and was premiered through Shade 45. It was produced by Seven and the music video premiered on May 29, 2011 on MTV2. "Mama Nem", featuring Krizz Kaliko, was the second song released. It was produced by David Sanders II and was premiered as a music video on MTV2. "Worldwide Choppers", was the third song to be released featuring Yelawolf, Busta Rhymes, Twista, Ceza, JL of B. Hood, U$O, D-Loc and Twisted Insane. It debuted on the US Bubbling Under Hot 100 Singles chart at number four and on the Top Heatseekers chart at number 15.

A music video for "Am I a Psycho?" was said by Hopsin on Facebook that it was currently in the making with him, Tech N9ne, and B.o.B. Funk Volume head Damien 'Dame' Ritter confirmed on November 24 that filming would take place during the last week of November. The music video for "Am I a Psycho?" was finished filming on December 1 and aired first on January 22, 2012 on MTV.

Upon the album's release, "Fuck Food" featuring Krizz Kaliko, Lil Wayne and T-Pain debuted at number 47 on the Rap Digital Songs chart.

Tour
A tour for the album, "All 6's and 7's: The Tour", began on May 26, 2011 in Seattle, Washington. The tour had 62 shows. Fellow Strange Music artists Big Scoob, Jay Rock, Krizz Kaliko, Kutt Calhoun, ¡Mayday! and Stevie Stone served as supporting acts for the tour. Irv Da Phenom was a surprise guest.

Critical reception

All 6's and 7's received universal acclaim from critics. At Metacritic, which assigns a normalized rating out of 100 to reviews from mainstream publications, the album received an average score of 81, based on seven reviews.  David Jeffries of AllMusic said, "Gimmicks abound on this dark carnival of an album, and if you can't hang with some murder talk and misogyny, it's best to stay away, but this fat, epic effort is still a swift thrill ride and doesn't bore despite its size." Nathan S. of DJBooth said, "6's & 7's is a hard album to deliver a final verdict. It's an album that was made for a very specific group, everyone else be damned, and so while I honestly can't say I'm a full fledged Techaholic, I do have to acknowledge that for many this album will be nothing short of epic."

Andres Vasquez of HipHopDX stated "All 6's and 7's doesn't disappoint as a well-balanced offering." Steve Juon of RapReviews.com said, "Tech has done everything in his power to reach out to the broadest fan base on All 6's and 7's by keeping it real and giving you something you can feel at the same time." Mosi Reeves of Spin said, "All 6's and 7's is an admirable attempt at balancing Tech's heavy-metal rep and hard-won maturity." Adam Fleischer of XXL said, "The album is the first test of Tech's ability to balance his new industry connections with the distinct style that his Technicians have become accustomed to over the years. Luckily, he reaches that marker without any real stumbles along the way."

Commercial performance
All 6's and 7's debuted at number four on the US Billboard 200 with 56,000 copies sold in its first week.

Track listing

Charts

Weekly charts

Year-end charts

References

External links
 Official Website

Tech N9ne albums
2011 albums
Albums produced by B.o.B
Albums produced by J.U.S.T.I.C.E. League
Albums produced by Seven (record producer)
Strange Music albums